Volga is an unincorporated community in Barbour County, West Virginia, United States. Volga has a post office with ZIP code 26238.

An early variant name was Burnersville; the name Volga is a transfer from the Volga River in Europe.

References

Unincorporated communities in Barbour County, West Virginia
Unincorporated communities in West Virginia